Hemiphyllodactylus hongkongensis, also known as the Hong Kong slender gecko, is a species of gecko. It is endemic to Hong Kong.

References

Hemiphyllodactylus
Reptiles of Hong Kong
Endemic fauna of Hong Kong
Reptiles described in 2018